Ghantapatuas  (Odia: "ଘଣ୍ଟପାଟୁଆ") are traditional male folk dancers from the Indian state of Odisha. They belong to the Bhopa or Raula caste.

Etymology 

Ghata 
The  is an earthen pitcher filled with holy water kept on a wooden stand cemented by mud, vermilion and above it a flower-clad  made up of coconut leaf sticks with flower hangings which represents the Goddess they worship.

Ghanta 
The  is the main accompanying instrument.

Dance 
The dance is an offering to the goddesses Sarala, Hingula, Charchika, Bhagabati, Mangala and Chandi as servants. 

The dance normally includes two to four men. One, the  dresses as the Goddess and is the  bearer and dancer.

After the dance they distribute sacred bel leaves and vermilion to the public (bhaktas). People offer them money, rice, vegetables, coconut,  and  that they later distribute among themselves.

Performance 
The dance is offered in village after village throughout the month of Chaitra (March to April) in Hindu calendar. The final performance comes on Maha Vishuva  Sankranti or Pana Sankranti, which falls normally on 13 or 14 April. It is celebrated as Odia New Year.

References 

Culture of Odisha